Seguí is a village and municipality in Entre Ríos Province in north-eastern Argentina.

Culture
Writer Leandro R. Puntin was raised and has residence in this town.

References

Populated places in Entre Ríos Province